Liia may refer to:
 Liia, an Estonian feminine given name
 Liia, an island in Estonia
 5411 Liia, an asteroid
 Local independence of irrelevant alternatives in decision theory
The LIIA, the acronym for the Latvian Institute of International Affairs